Robin Davis is a French film director and screenwriter.

Filmography
1974: Cher Victor
1979: The Police War
1982: Le choc
1983: J'ai épousé une ombre 
1985: Hors-la-loi
1989: La Fille des collines

Television
(selective listing)
1998: Les rives du Paradis
2006: Jeanne Poisson, marquise de Pompadour
2008: Disparitions
2009: Bas les cœurs

References

External links

1943 births
Living people
Mass media people from Marseille
French film directors
French male screenwriters